Carles Font-Rossell (born 26 December 1967, in Canillo, Andorra) was the Permanent Representative to the United Nations for Andorra and, from 14 March 2008, he was also Ambassador of Andorra to the United States. He was succeeded in both positions by Narcís Casal de Fonsdeviela.

Education
Font-Rossell holds a Bachelor of Business Administration from the European University of Barcelona, Spain.  He speaks four languages.

Career
Prior to his appointment to the United Nations, Font-Rossell was the Minister of Youth and Sports for his country, beginning in 2005.  From 2003 to 2005, he held the chairmanship of Andorra's Rugby Federation.  He was a Canillo Parish Council member from 1996 to 1999.  In addition to his public service, he owns several hotels in Andorra.

See also
List of Permanent Representatives to the UN

References

1967 births
Living people
Ambassadors of Andorra to the United States
Permanent Representatives of Andorra to the United Nations
Andorran diplomats
People from Canillo